Aulikara dynasty may refer to-

First Aulikara dynasty, the first royal house belonging to the ancient Aulikara clan
Second Aulikara dynasty, the second dynasty belonging to the Aulikara clan
Aulikara Empire, founded by Yashodharman of the Second Aulikara dynasty
Aulikara, an ancient clan